Kristján Gauti Emilsson (born 26 April 1993) is an Icelandic footballer who plays as a forward.

Career
In 2009, Kristján made his debut for FH Hafnarfjörður in the highest Icelandic league. After an internship with Liverpool, he signed a three-year deal with the club and played in the youth academy until mid 2012. He returned to this former team where he made his real break through. On 23 July 2014, it was announced that Kristján had signed a three-year deal with Dutch Eerste Divisie side NEC. In January 2016, Emilsson ended his professional career because of personal reasons. On 12 June 2020 he signed for his boyhood club FH Hafnarfjörður after 4 years in retirement.

International career
Kristján played for several Icelandic youth squads and was called for the national team in June 2014 but did not play for them.

Honours

Club
NEC
Eerste Divisie (1): 2014–15

References

External links
 Voetbal International profile 
 

1993 births
Living people
Kristjan Emilsson
Kristjan Emilsson
Kristjan Emilsson
Kristjan Emilsson
Liverpool F.C. players
NEC Nijmegen players
Eerste Divisie players
People from Gothenburg
Association football forwards
Kristjan Emilsson
Kristjan Emilsson
Kristjan Emilsson
Kristjan Emilsson